Dark Feed is a 2013 horror film written and directed by Shawn and Michael Rasmussen. It was first released on March 18, 2013 and centers upon a group of filmmakers that decide to cut costs by filming in an abandoned psychiatric hospital, only to end up slowly turning insane. Filming took place in New England using some of the buildings seen in Shutter Island. The Rasmussens came up with the idea for Dark Feed while visiting the set of another film, Long Distance, which was filming in an abandoned psychiatric hospital.

Synopsis
The movie follows a film crew that decides to film a low budget horror film in an abandoned psychiatric hospital. They're already exhausted and overworked, making them eager to finish the project and move on. Unfortunately their presence seems to bring new life to the hospital, and it starts to exert a strange influence over the cast and crew, causing them to act in increasingly bizarre ways. The remaining crew members must find a way to escape from the hospital before they also end up becoming its victims.

Cast
Evalena Marie as Pierced Girl
Jason Beaubien as Andrei
Michael Reed as Jack
Bree Elrod as M.G.
Victoria Nugent as Beth
Mark DeAngelis as DP
Dayna Cousins as Marissa
Jonathan Thomson as Harry
Michael Scott Allen as Darrell
Rebecca Whitehurst as Rachel
Hardy Winburn as Chuck
Andrew Rudick as Chris (as Andy Rudick)
Jessica Lauren Napier as Jessica
Daniel Berger-Jones as Mitch
Danny Bryck as Brian

Reception
Critical reception for Dark Feed was mixed. Shock Till You Drop gave a predominantly negative review, criticizing it as "a boring and unoriginal film unworthy of watching." In contrast, Fearnet's review was more positive and Weinberg commented that although the film had "a lot of stuff you've seen before", the movie "re-heated and reconfigured into a crafty little creeper that actually works". Starburst gave the film a score of 5/10, saying that the movie was "utterly unmemorable but not otherwise bad".

References

External links
 
 

2013 films
2013 horror films
American horror films
Films about filmmaking
2010s English-language films
2010s American films
English-language horror films